This article lists various water polo records and statistics in relation to the Italy women's national water polo team at the Summer Olympics.

The Italy women's national water polo team has participated in 4 of 5 official women's water polo tournaments.

Abbreviations

Team statistics

Comprehensive results by tournament
Note: Results of Olympic qualification tournaments are not included. Last updated: 5 May 2021.

Legend
  – Champions
  – Runners-up
  – Third place
  – Fourth place
  – Qualified for forthcoming tournament

Number of appearances
Last updated: 5 May 2021.

Best finishes
Last updated: 5 May 2021.

Finishes in the top four
Last updated: 5 May 2021.

Medal table
Last updated: 5 May 2021.

Player statistics

Multiple appearances

The following table is pre-sorted by number of Olympic appearances (in descending order), year of the last Olympic appearance (in ascending order), year of the first Olympic appearance (in ascending order), date of birth (in ascending order), name of the player (in ascending order), respectively.

Multiple medalists

The following table is pre-sorted by total number of Olympic medals (in descending order), number of Olympic gold medals (in descending order), number of Olympic silver medals (in descending order), year of receiving the last Olympic medal (in ascending order), year of receiving the first Olympic medal (in ascending order), name of the player (in ascending order), respectively.

Top goalscorers

The following table is pre-sorted by number of total goals (in descending order), year of the last Olympic appearance (in ascending order), year of the first Olympic appearance (in ascending order), name of the player (in ascending order), respectively.

Goalkeepers

The following table is pre-sorted by edition of the Olympics (in ascending order), cap number or name of the goalkeeper (in ascending order), respectively.

Last updated: 1 April 2021.

Abbreviation
 Eff % – Save efficiency (Saves / Shots)

Source:
 Official Results Books (PDF): 2004 (pp. 72–73), 2008 (pp. 68–69), 2012 (pp. 362–363), 2016 (pp. 212–213).

Top sprinters
The following table is pre-sorted by number of total sprints won (in descending order), year of the last Olympic appearance (in ascending order), year of the first Olympic appearance (in ascending order), name of the sprinter (in ascending order), respectively.

* Number of sprinters (30+ sprints won): 0
 Number of sprinters (20–29 sprints won): 1
 Number of sprinters (10–19 sprints won): 0
 Number of sprinters (5–9 sprints won): 1
 Last updated: 15 May 2021.

Abbreviation
 Eff % – Efficiency (Sprints won / Sprints contested)
 HUN – Hungary
 ITA – Italy

Source:
 Official Results Books (PDF): 2004 (pp. 72–73), 2008 (pp. 68–69), 2012 (pp. 362–363), 2016 (pp. 212–213).

Olympic champions

2004 Summer Olympics

Water polo people at the opening and closing ceremonies

Flag bearers

Some sportspeople were chosen to carry the national flag of their country at the opening and closing ceremonies of the Olympic Games. As of the 2016 Summer Olympics, one female water polo player was given the honour to carry the flag for Italy.

After winning gold in the women's tournament, Carmela Allucci, the captain of the Italian women's water polo team, carried the national flag of Italy at the closing ceremony of the 2004 Summer Olympics, becoming the first female water polo player to be given the honour.

Legend
  – Opening ceremony of the 2008 Summer Olympics
  – Closing ceremony of the 2012 Summer Olympics
  – Female flag bearer
 Flag bearer‡ – Flag bearer who won the tournament with her team

See also
 Italy men's Olympic water polo team records and statistics
 List of women's Olympic water polo tournament records and statistics
 Lists of Olympic water polo records and statistics
 Italy at the Olympics

References

Sources

ISHOF

External links
 Italy women's national water polo team – Official website
 Olympic water polo – Official website

.Olympics, Women
Olympic water polo team records and statistics